Glipa guamensis is a species of beetle in the genus Glipa. It was described in 1942.

References

guamensis
Beetles described in 1942